Megalodacne fasciata is a species of pleasing fungus beetle in the family Erotylidae. It is found in North America.

References

Further reading

External links

 

Erotylidae
Beetles described in 1777